Lionel Torres (born 16 March 1975 in Perpignan, France), is a French athlete who competes in recurve archery. He competed at the 2000 Olympic Games, qualifying in 11th place but losing in the first knockout round, and has won two individual medals at the World Archery Championships and was the world number one archer from May 2002 to February 2003.

References

1975 births
Living people
French male archers
Archers at the 1996 Summer Olympics
Archers at the 2000 Summer Olympics
Olympic archers of France
Sportspeople from Perpignan
World Archery Championships medalists